The M4 motorway Usk bridge, officially St. Julians Bridge, carries the M4 motorway across the River Usk in the city of Newport, Wales.

The bridge comprises two separate  structures, for the eastbound and westbound carriageways. When travelling westbound, the bridges lead directly into the twin  Brynglas Tunnels. Work commenced on both the bridge and the tunnels on 10 September 1962, two months after work commenced on the George Street Bridge further downstream. The entire Newport bypass section of the M4 (junctions 24 to 28) finally opened in 1967.

In 1989, two crossings were added to connect the M4 with the newly constructed junction 25a and the A4042.

References

Bridges completed in 1967
Bridges in Newport, Wales
Motorway bridges in Wales
Usk bridge